Khanto Bala Rai (born 1897) was a Bengali Christian educator, head of the Mission Girls' High School in Midnapore beginning in 1923.

Early life 
Khanto Bala Rai was the daughter of evangelist Sachidananda Rai and teacher Esther Rai, Christian converts in Bengal. She attended Bethune College in Calcutta, and the University of Nebraska.

Career 
Rai taught at a Baptist girls' school in Midnapore. Her older sister, Shanta Bala Rai, was also a teacher at Midnapore.

Rai traveled with medical missionary Mary W. Bacheler to the United States in 1921. That year, she made appearances and speeches at American Baptist gatherings, with Burmese doctor Ma Saw Sa and Chinese teacher Kan En Vong, among others, as a group representing the work of Baptist women missionaries in Asian countries. She collected English-language books while in the United States, to create a library at the school in Midnapore when she returned. "We would like all kinds of children's story books, magazines, and some religious story books," she explained to a Baptist publication in 1922.

She returned to Midnapore after her time in the United States, and returned to schoolwork there, as headmistress of the Midnapore Mission Girls' School starting in 1923. "In executive ability, tact with teachers, pupils, and patrons, and keen insight into the needs and opportunities of the school Miss Rai has shown her real worth and has greatly strengthened the school," noted a 1924 report. She described the challenges of a growing school in a 1925 letter to American Baptists. She was still principal of the school in a 1926 update.

References 

Indian educators
Bengali educators
Indian Baptists
1897 births
University of Nebraska alumni
Bethune College alumni
Year of death missing
Women educators from West Bengal
Indian women educators
20th-century Indian educators
Educationists from India
Indian educational theorists
Indian women educational theorists
20th-century Indian educational theorists
Indian academic administrators
Indian academics
Indian women academics
Indian schoolteachers
Heads of schools in India
People from Paschim Medinipur district